Ronald E. Braunstein (born c. 1940) is a Canadian retired curler. He played as second on Team Manitoba (skipped by his brother Terry Braunstein) and won the 1965 Brier. Ron was a medical student at the time and had to miss the World championships that year. He was replaced on the team by Gordon McTavish.

References

Curlers from Manitoba
Brier champions
Jewish Canadian sportspeople
Canadian male curlers
1940s births
Living people